Lindelwe Siyanda Zungu (born 16 May 1995 in) is a South African professional rugby union player who most recently played with the . He usually plays as a winger or a fullback.

Rugby career

2011–13: Schoolboy rugby / Pumas
He played for them at three schools tournaments as their first choice fullback – the Under-16 Grant Khomo Week in 2011 and the Under-18 Craven Week tournaments in both 2012 and 2013.

2014–present: Eastern Province Kings
Zungu moved to Port Elizabeth for the 2014, joining the Eastern Province Kings academy. He was included in the  squad that participated in the 2014 Under-19 Provincial Championship, in their first season in Group A after winning promotion from Group B at the end of 2013. Zungu started all twelve of their matches in the competition, mainly starting on the left wing, but also playing as a fullback or outside centre on occasion.

He progressed to the Under-21 squad in 2015 and played in eleven of the team's twelve matches in Group A of the 2015 Under-21 Provincial Championship.

After the 2016 Varsity Cup, Zungu was one of several youngsters that were included in the  squad that competed in the 2016 Currie Cup qualification series.

References

South African rugby union players
Living people
1995 births
People from Vryheid
Rugby union centres
Rugby union wings
Rugby union fullbacks
Eastern Province Elephants players
Rugby union players from KwaZulu-Natal